Aglaothorax longipennis is a species of insect in family Tettigoniidae. It is endemic to the United States.

Distribution
This species has been studied at Topanga State Park.

References

Tettigoniidae
Endemic fauna of the United States
Critically endangered fauna of the United States
Taxonomy articles created by Polbot
Insects described in 1981